The Round Island burrowing boa (Bolyeria multocarinata) is an extinct species of snake, in the monotypic genus Bolyeria, in the family Bolyeriidae. The species, which was endemic to Mauritius, was last seen on Round Island in 1975. There are no recognized subspecies.

Description
Its colour was described as light brown with blackish spots dorsally, and pink marbled with blackish ventrally. It had a pointed snout with a cylindrical body and head. Its general body form suggests that the Round Island burrowing boa had fossorial tendencies. This species' closest living relative is the Round Island boa (Casarea dussumieri).

Geographic range
The Round Island burrowing boa had an extremely small range of only . Its habitats were hardwood forests and palm savanna.  In the past it was found in Mauritius on Gunner's Quoin, Flat Island, Round Island, and Ile de la Passe. It survived the longest on Round Island, where it was last recorded. The type locality given is "Port Jackson" (in error).

Habitat
The preferred natural habitat of B. multocarinata was forest.

Diet
The diet of B. multocarinata is unknown, but it is thought to have eaten lizards and their eggs, as well as the chicks and eggs of ground-nesting and burrowing seabirds.

Reproduction
B. multocarinata was oviparous. Clutch size was about five eggs.

Conservation status
The species Bolyeria multocarinata is classified as Extinct (EX) on the IUCN Red List of threatened species (v2.3, 1994). It was already rare by 1949 and was last seen by conservationists in 1974.  Reasons for its extinction are habitat loss caused by soil erosion due to overgrazing by goats and rabbits and heavily persecuted by early settlers.

References

Further reading
Boie F (1827). "Bemerkungen über Merrem's Versuch eines Systems der Amphibien. 1te Lieferung: Ophidier ". Isis von Oken, Jena 20: 508–566. ("Eryx Multocarinata", new species, p. 513). (in German).
Boulenger GA (1893). Catalogue of the Snakes in the British Museum (Natural History). Volume I., Containing the Families ... Boidæ ... London: Trustees of the British Museum (Natural History). (Taylor and Francis, printers). xiii + 448 pp. + Plates I-XXVIII. (Genus Bolieria, pp. 121–122; species Bolieria multicarinata, p. 122).
Gray JE (1842). "Synopsis of the species of prehensile-tailed Snakes, or Family BOIDÆ". Zoological Miscellany 2: 41–46. (Bolyeria, new genus, p. 46).
Jan [G] (1864). Iconographie générale des Ophidiens. Troisième livraison [=Thirteenth issue]. [Illustrations by Sordelli]. Paris: Baillière. Index + Plates I-VI. (Platygaster multicarinatus, Plate III). (in French).

Bolyeriidae
Extinct reptiles
Reptile extinctions since 1500
Extinct animals of Mauritius
Endemic fauna of Mauritius
Reptiles described in 1827
Taxa named by Friedrich Boie
Reptiles of Mauritius
Species made extinct by human activities